Mike Fink Keel Boats (or River Rogue Keel Boats) were small boats that navigated the Rivers of America at Disneyland, the Magic Kingdom in Walt Disney World Resort and Disneyland Park in Disneyland Paris.

History
The Mike Fink Keel Boats were based on two episodes of the Davy Crockett miniseries which aired on the Disneyland TV show in 1955 -- "Davy Crockett's Keel Boat Race" (Nov 16) and "Davy Crockett and the River Pirates" (December 14). The ride was named after Mike Fink, the "King of the River" who lost the keel boat race. The two 38-foot boats, the Gullywhumper and the Bertha Mae, were the actual props that had been used in making the TV shows a few months earlier.

The boats were free-floating and traveled around Tom Sawyer Island Riders would sit on benches either inside the cabin or on the roof of the cabin.

The keelboats at Disneyland closed at the end of the summer on September 6, 1994 and remained closed for nearly a year and a half until coming back in early March 1996. The Magic Kingdom's keel boats ran continuously until they closed in April 2001.

The Magic Kingdom location's dock was reused as an extended queue line for The Haunted Mansion.

Closing
At about 5:30 p.m. on May 17, 1997, the Disneyland Gullywhumper boat began to rock side to side. It capsized, dumping a full boatload of passengers into the Rivers of America, leaving several with minor injuries. The boat was removed from the waters for inspection and neither the Gullywhumper nor the Bertha Mae returned for the next operating season. The Bertha Mae was put up on Disney's eBay Auction Site and was sold for $15,000 to Richard Kraft, and was later featured in a scene from Kraft's documentary Finding Kraftland. It was billed as an unseaworthy craft.

The Gullywhumper returned to Disneyland's Rivers of America as a prop and was moored on Tom Sawyer Island where passengers on the Davy Crockett's Explorer Canoes, the Sailing Ship Columbia, and the Mark Twain Riverboat could see it while passing. Eventually, hull damage caused the boat to flood and sink, and it was finally removed from public view in April 2009.

A former Mike Fink Keel Boat from the Magic Kingdom's version of the attraction today sits as a non-functional prop on the banks of Tom Sawyer Island.

Regarding its status at Disneyland Paris, the attraction does not appear anymore on the Park Guides or Maps. After a short opening during the summer 2010, the attraction is currently closed and hidden from the view of visitors with 'Danger: Bear Cave' signs surrounding it. The reasons for its closure or lack of operation are not clear, but some may suggest the following: small capacity (only two boats) generating great waiting lines, required extensive training to operating Cast Members (first aid, navigation procedures, etc.) and the extremely poor and dirty condition of the Rivers of the Farwest Lake make the Riverboats a non-suitable attraction for Disneyland Paris.

See also
 List of former Disneyland attractions
 List of Magic Kingdom attractions

References

External links
 Walt Dated World - Mike Fink Keel Boats

Former Walt Disney Parks and Resorts attractions
Disneyland Park (Paris)
Walt Disney Parks and Resorts gentle boat rides
Frontierland
Liberty Square (Magic Kingdom)
Amusement rides introduced in 1955
Amusement rides introduced in 1971
Amusement rides introduced in 1992
Amusement rides that closed in 1997
Amusement rides that closed in 2001
Western (genre) amusement rides
1955 establishments in California
1997 disestablishments in California
1971 establishments in Florida
2001 disestablishments in Florida
French companies established in 1992
American companies established in 1955
American companies established in 1971